BBC Radio London is the BBC's local radio station serving Greater London and its surrounding areas. The station broadcasts across the area and beyond on the 94.9 FM frequency, DAB, Virgin Media channel 937, Sky channel 0152 (in the London area only), Freeview channel 721, and online.

The station's output is generally similar to that of other BBC Local Radio stations and targets a broad, mainstream audience. While previous incarnations of the station offered a more diverse range of programmes for London's various ethnic, religious, social and cultural communities, specialist programming now remains in a smaller form and is mostly broadcast at weekends.

According to RAJAR, the station has a weekly audience of 625,000 listeners and a 1.0% share as of December 2022.

History

1970–1988: Radio London 

Local radio arrived in London as part of the second wave of BBC local stations, following a successful pilot project headed by Frank Gillard, who on visiting the United States discovered local radio stations of varying formats and brought this concept to Britain.

Test transmissions for the new local radio station were carried out from Wrotham, Kent, on 95.3 MHz in FM mono, relaying BBC Radio 1 (at the time broadcast only on medium wave), with several announcements informing listeners of the new service. On 6 October 1970 Radio London was launched, three years before commercial radio for Greater London in the guise of LBC. An additional medium wave frequency was allocated on 1457 kHz (206 metres) from Brookman's Park. 95.3 soon changed to 94.9.

BBC Radio London was the local station for the capital, although in the early days it relied heavily on news reports from other stations in the BBC network and often shared programming with BBC Radio 1 and BBC Radio 2. It took on a fairly lively sound and featured (as it does to this day) extensive traffic reports, phone-in programmes — it pioneered the daily phone-in in the UK — and much contemporary and middle-of-the-road music. For several months after launch, the station was not able to play commercial records as no agreement had been reached over so-called needle time, which led to London listeners becoming acquainted with broadcast library music from outside the UK (notably the Canadian Talent Library) and music from film soundtracks. A phone-in programme, Sounding Brass, was pioneered, devised and first presented by Owen Spencer-Thomas in 1977. Listeners were invited to choose a Christmas carol or hymn while a Salvation Army brass band stood by in the studio to play their request live. It later moved to BBC Radio 2 and was presented by Gloria Hunniford.

As soon as Independent Local Radio stations LBC and Capital London went on air, public attention to Radio London declined, with the station attempting to copy both.

Radio London started regular broadcasts from Harewood House, Hanover Square, near Oxford Circus, later moving to 35 Marylebone High Street - the former Radio Times warehouse, famously without windows and providing an enormous sub-basement studio.

Tests for FM stereo began in 1981 with Music on the Move, a programme featuring non-stop music, prior to full launch on 11 February. The FM transmitter was shortly moved to Crystal Palace. This coincided with the planned relaunch in 1981, which saw the station take on a style that was softer than BBC Radio 2 - a station predominantly playing "easy listening" music. Music ranged from softer contemporary pop, such as The Carpenters, to light classical music. This move was unpopular with employed staff, who thought it very un-hip, and politicians who would question the need for a local radio station to sound like the two music-based BBC national networks. However, the relaunch led to improved audience figures and a string of awards and accolades.

One of its programmes on the schedule was Black Londoners, devised by Ray Criushank, a community relations officer for the London Borough of Hammersmith and Fulham, and presented by Alex Pascall. The programme helped to develop on-air talent from London's Afro-Caribbean community, namely Juliet Alexander, Syd Burke and Mike Phillips and was the pioneering programme on television or radio to regularly speak to Black Londoners. The programme's title was changed to Black London shortly before Radio London closed (see below). It was revived for a short time in 2003, with Pascall returning as a presenter. The forerunner to the BBC Asian Network was an Asian programme, London Sounds Eastern, presented by Vernon Corea who was appointed the BBC's Ethnic Minorities Adviser in the 1970s. Pandit Ravi Shankar, Indian pop star Usha Uthup, were among those interviewed for London Sounds Eastern, launched on BBC Radio London in 1976 and produced by Keith Yeomans. The programme introduced the Bollywood music of Asha Bhosle and Lata Mangeshkar to new London audiences.

A programming relaunch in 1984 saw Radio London adopt the tagline "The Heart and Soul of London", with more soul music being played during the day. Tony Blackburn from BBC Radio 1 moved up the schedule to host a morning show for housewives, playing classic soul of the 1970s and presenting a show laced with cheeky jokes and double entendres, once daring to "get out his 12-incher" - referring to an LP record. He was dismissed in 1988 crossing the line of taste and decency, conveniently in time for the station's first relaunch. Regular Soul Night Outs were held initially in Kilburn but later in other venues, such as Ilford. This was where Dave Pearce, later of BBC Radio 1 fame, made his first regular appearances as a BBC DJ (Monday night programme "A fresh start to the week"). Two of the station's producers, Guy Hornsby (Tony Blackburn) and Mike Gray (Robbie Vincent Telephone Programme), went on to create the ground-breaking commercial dance stations Kiss 102 and Kiss 105, which recaptured the somewhat anarchic spirit of BBC Radio London in its mid-1980s heyday to great audience and commercial success.

Radio London closed on 7 October 1988. The final programme, just before its 18th birthday, was presented by Mike Sparrow and Susie Barnes. Immediately after closedown at 7pm, test transmissions began for the next 17 days, preparing for a new radio station for London, Greater London Radio (GLR).

1988–2000: Greater London Radio (GLR) 

Test transmissions for the new Greater London Radio GLR began as soon as Radio London closed. Its pre-launch announcements stated in no uncertain terms that GLR was to be radically different in style promising the fastest news, traffic and travel news every 20 minutes and the best music mix. GLR was to be the first new radio station in London for 15 years.

An irreverent announcement, voiced by Chris Morris, aired four days before launch:

Heading the new station were Managing Editor Matthew Bannister and Programme Organiser Trevor Dann. Bannister, from Capital London, favoured a young, racy, news and speech format, miles away from the typically stuffy BBC Local Radio sound. Dann came from Radio 1, via BBC TV's Whistle Test, and developed an album-oriented music policy. GLR was aimed at people who hate pop but love music, hate prattle (excessive on-air talk) but want to know what's what where in the world. The station was aimed at 25 to 45-year-olds, who perhaps grew up with Radio 1, but now wanted to be intelligently informed about the city in which they live, and the world in general. Early promotions used the phrase "rock 'n' rolling news". Much of the daytime speech output covered London events and nightlife, with comedians and other artists being interviewed. The music mix was best described as Adult album alternative, though indie bands such as The Wonder Stuff were also played. It has been said this Triple-A format inspired the launch of BBC Radio 6 Music years later.

Chris Evans took on a variety of roles on GLR, often presenting a weekend show, ending in 1993 as his media career took off. Danny Baker has had a long association with the station, presenting Weekend Breakfast from 1989 to 1990 and then returned to present a Sunday morning show from 1996 to 1998. Janice Long presented the Breakfast show on the station from 1989 to 1991, and Kevin Greening started as a producer in 1989, before becoming a presenter of the Breakfast show with Jeremy Nicholas in 1991. Bob Harris also presented shows for the station from 1994 to 1998 after leaving BBC Radio 1. Early afternoon programming previewed London's varied entertainment scene, interviewing comedians and other performers. Richard Cook had a Saturday night jazz show.

Specialist speech programmes in the evening were aimed at London's communities: Asian, Afro-Caribbean, Jewish, Gay, and Irish. Black London was replaced with Margaret Jones aka The Ranking Miss P, who was dropped by BBC Radio 1. Lavender Lounge, the programme for the gay community, was presented by comedian Amy Lamé. Weekends featured extensive sports coverage, centring on football and London's numerous clubs such as Arsenal, Tottenham, and West Ham United.

In 1989 GLR set up a youth-based radio training facility at Vauxhall College, SW8, which was followed with a second course based at White City, W12. This was allocated funds from the London Borough of Hammersmith and Fulham and the British parliament.

One unique aspect of GLR was the ability to directly access Scotland Yard's network of traffic cameras across London's busiest streets. This enabled its reporters, most commonly "Bob at the Yard", to give unparalleled accurate traffic and travel news to its listeners. The reports were known as 20/20 Travel, named because its travel reports were read out every 20 minutes during peak times. No other radio station had this access for a while, even managing to out-do Capital Radio's traffic plane, known as the Flying Eye.

GLR continues to be celebrated many years after its demise.

Criticism and closure 
Three years into the newly relaunched station, the station was given an additional three years to prove itself to its audience by senior BBC management or close for good; this threat was also applied to its other metropolitan BBC Local Radio stations BBC WM in Birmingham and Manchester's BBC GMR. The threat was lifted after the BBC deemed it sufficiently patronised to remain on-air; however, criticism of the station grew from its Radio London days, causing then Minister for Broadcasting David Mellor to remark: "The BBC must think hard whether it is occupying radio frequencies without making much use of them." This claim was rejected by senior management.

In 1991, Matthew Bannister left to spearhead the BBC's charter-renewal strategy called Extending Choice. He was replaced as Managing Editor by Trevor Dann. Kate Marsh was appointed News Editor. In 1993 GLR was forced to relinquish its 1458 kHz medium wave frequency, for a new commercial radio station which was eventually won by Sunrise Radio. Previously it had been simulcasting with 94.9 MHz FM with a few programmes which occasionally opted from FM. In 1993 Nigel Chapman, Head of BBC South & East, drove through a policy of "speech shoulders", forcing GLR to drop its music/speech mix at breakfast and drive times. Dann resigned in protest and left the BBC.

Steve Panton, formerly Managing Editor of BBC Radio Solent, took over and GLR limped on with a small listener base, but its music policy gained a cult following, particularly among its younger adult listeners. One of its noted DJs on-air at the time was Gary Crowley, who had a weekend show which regularly showcased new and unsigned bands, often not getting much airplay on commercial radio stations, and to a lesser extent, Radio 1. Kaleem Sheikh presented the A to Z of Indian Film and Classical music to a mainstream and specialist audience. Other DJs, notably Bob Mills ("Millsie"), had a loyal following of cab drivers and cockney phone-ins. With the launch of new specialist commercial stations Kiss 100, Jazz FM, and XFM GLR remained distinct. Speech rather than music formed a higher percentage of airtime than most commercial stations.

In 1999 following a consultation exercise on local broadcasting in the South East, the BBC decided to rebrand GLR and substantially change the programming. A campaign to "Save GLR" was organised and a petition delivered to the BBC. The argument became acrimonious. In particular, those opposed to the changes argued that the BBC never organised a public meeting in London as part of the consultation exercise and, when one was organised by supporters of the station, no one involved in the consultation exercise attended. Although the campaign was unsuccessful in saving GLR and the rebranding went ahead the next year, it demonstrated the existence of a loyal audience for its format. GLR's music format and several of its presenters returned to the BBC with the launch of the national digital station BBC Radio 6 Music in 2002.

2000–2001: BBC London Live 94.9 
Facing even more public criticism over GLR's position in the London radio market and its very low listening reach, the station was relaunched on 25 March 2000 as BBC London Live 94.9 in a blaze of publicity. Promising even more speech and less music, London Live — originally the title for GLR's lunch-time news show (presented by Charles Carroll, now on BBC Radio 2) — was launched with new on-air personalities and new shows, including a speech-heavy breakfast show and a mid-morning phone-in and debate. Only Drivetime and the specialist shows would remain, albeit refreshed. The re-launch at the time was promoted by huge billboards and television spots on BBC Newsroom South East depicting London's famous landmarks as radio paraphernalia (a woman seen raising Big Ben as a radio aerial, for example). It cost the BBC in excess of £20 million, an amount seen by vocal critics led by private media as "obscene amount of money" and added to repeated calls for the licence fee (which also funds radio) to be scrapped.

Leading the relaunch was Station Director David Robey, who hired such personalities as Lisa I'Anson, Vanessa Feltz, Tom Watt, and various black presenters including Eddie Nestor and Dotun Adebayo. Most notably another presenter, Henry Bonsu, was controversially sacked for reportedly being "too intellectual".

2001–2015: BBC London 94.9 

In October 2001 the name was changed to BBC London 94.9. Newly updated jingles were added with its new slogan "On TV, On Radio, Online", voiced by BBC London News host Emily Maitlis. The overall branding for this was BBC LDN.

New recruits to BBC London 94.9 included Jon Gaunt from BBC Three Counties Radio, former GLR presenter Danny Baker, and Sean Rowley (hosting the Guilty Pleasures show). Danny Baker hosted a breakfast show, which was co-hosted with American comedian Amy Lamé. Jon Gaunt then hosted the mid-morning phone-in show. Robert Elms was kept at lunchtime. Vanessa Feltz took over Lisa I'Anson's afternoon slot with a phone-in. Drivetime with Eddie Nestor and Kath Melandri guide Londoners home with news updates, sport, travel and debates with the public. Specialist programmes for the Black community emerged at the weekends along with sports coverage and alternative music shows in the evening. BBC London also saw the return of Tony Blackburn on Saturdays, more than 20 years since he first appeared on the station. His show was as before, playing classic soul music and chat.

Although having joined at the end of the stations time as GLR, Norman Jay's Giant 45 show attracted a large and loyal following until Jay's eventual departure in February 2008 having been moved to a "digital only slot". This was by no means the first change to specialist music programming by Robey to have attracted a negative reaction. In 2003, a campaign called Londumb Live was briefly launched as a response to the axing of a number of specialist shows including Coldcut and Ross Allen.

Additional coverage for football was made possible through a combination of its DAB Digital Radio platform, on Sky channel 0152, and on a BBC Essex transmitter 765 kHz medium wave (for West Ham commentaries).

BBC London 94.9 was the first BBC Local Radio to air a 24-hour live-stream online, which coincided with the 2001 re-launch. It also aired on DAB Digital Radio in July 2000 and on Sky (channel 0152) in 2005 in the London area but it can be accessed within the UK and Ireland by manual tuning.

2015–present: BBC Radio London

On 6 October 2015, BBC London 94.9 was re-branded as BBC Radio London.

On 23 March 2020, to prioritise resources during the Coronavirus pandemic 5 Live suspended overnight programmes between 1 a.m. and 5 a.m. and carried the output of BBC Radio London. This continued until early July when 5 Live resumed its overnight programming on weeknights. 5 Live continues to simulcast BBC Radio London on Friday and Saturday overnights. In 2022 presenter Salma El-Wardany took over the Breakfast Show, after Vanessa Feltz left the station after almost twenty years.

Programming

BBC Radio London is the only BBC Local Radio station which airs its own local programming 24 hours a day. Consequently, unlike all other BBC local stations, BBC Radio London does not simulcast regional programmes from sister stations or BBC Radio 5 Live during overnight hours.

Listening figures
RAJAR data, the audience measurement system in the UK, showed that BBC London 94.9 audience reach for the second quarter in 2014 was 572,000; which is its largest since the station rebranded as BBC London 94.9. Its latest audience figures (Quarter 4 2019) show a weekly audience of 469,000.

References

Further reading 
 Aircheck UK
 The Radio Companion by Paul Donovan

External links 
 
 The History of BBC London

 
1970 establishments in England
Radio stations established in 1970
Radio stations in London